Mohsen Eliasi (born June 3, 1985) is an Iranian Footballer who currently plays for Shahrdari Arak in Azadegan League.

Club career
He moved to Persepolis but because of two other good keepers Alireza Haghighi and Mehdi Vaezi he did not have any chance of playing. He moved to Shensa Arak in summer 2009.

References

Persian League Profile

Persepolis F.C. players
Living people
Shensa players
Homa F.C. players
1985 births
Iranian footballers
Association football goalkeepers